The Lapurr Sandstone, also spelled Lapur Sandstone, previously considered part of the informal "Turkana Grits", is a geological formation in Kenya (Turkana County). It is the oldest unit in the Turkana Basin. The strata date back to the Late Cretaceous, likely Campanian to Maastrichtian, based on palynology and the presence of dyrosaurs and mosasaurs, the upper part of the unit likely extends into the Palaeogene, based on zircon dating. It predominantly consists of fine-coarse arkosic sandstone, which has been interpreted as either been deposited in fluvial or shallow marine conditions. Dinosaur remains among other vertebrates have been recovered from it around Lokitaung Gorge, though these mostly consist of heavily abraded, isolated bones of robust morphology like sauropod limb bones and caudal vertebrae.

Vertebrate paleofauna

See also 
 List of dinosaur-bearing rock formations

References 

Geologic formations of Kenya
Upper Cretaceous Series of Africa
Campanian Stage
Maastrichtian Stage
Cretaceous–Paleogene boundary
Paleogene System of Africa
Danian Stage
Sandstone formations
Fluvial deposits
Paleontology in Kenya